Joseph or Joe Price may refer to:

 Joseph C. Price (1854–1893), president and a founder of Livingstone College, Salisbury, North Carolina
 Joseph Price (footballer) (fl. 1890s), amateur footballer
 Joe Price (footballer) (1886–1986), Australian rules footballer
 Joe Price (outfielder) (1897–1961), Major League Baseball center fielder
 Joe Price (cricketer) (1928–1992), Welsh cricketer
 Joseph Price (politician) (born 1945), member of the Canadian House of Commons
 Joe Price (pitcher) (born 1956), Major League Baseball pitcher
 Joseph Price (basketball) (fl. 1980s–2014), college basketball coach
 Joseph L. Price (fl. 1982–2015), American professor of sports and religion
 Joseph Price (veterinarian), NIH veterinarian who assisted in the early studies of the membrane oxygenator

See also
 Joseph Price House